Kitne Kool Hai Hum is an Indian comedy drama series created and co-produced by Ekta Kapoor and Shobha Kapoor under their banner Balaji Telefilms. The series premiered on 15 April 2002 on Zee TV.

Plot
The series revolves around the Chapanaria family who lives in Dhanduka village in rural Gujarat. The series explores how they become millionaires when they receive millions from the will of their grandfather. The series traces their day to day experiences which turn into comedy when they shift from their rural village to the posh city of Mumbai.

Cast 
 Jayati Bhatia
 Shoma Anand
 Darshan Jariwala
 Anurag Prapanna
 Aashish Kaul
 Rucha Gujarathi
 Karishma Tanna
 Anand Goradia
 Kusumit Sana
 Dheeraj Sarna

References

External links 
Official Page

Balaji Telefilms television series
Indian television sitcoms
Zee TV original programming
2002 Indian television series debuts
2003 Indian television series endings